Diatraea lentistrialis is a moth in the family Crambidae. It was described by George Hampson in 1919. It is found in Argentina and Venezuela.

References

Chiloini
Moths described in 1919